Bringing Home Father is a 1917 American silent comedy film directed by William Worthington and starring Franklyn Farnum, Agnes Vernon and Florence Mayon.

Cast
 Franklyn Farnum as Peter Drake
 Agnes Vernon as Jackie Swazey 
 Florence Mayon as Eliza Tilly Swazey
 Arthur Hoyt as Pa Swazey
 Dick La Reno as Mike Clancey

References

Bibliography
 Robert B. Connelly. The Silents: Silent Feature Films, 1910-36, Volume 40, Issue 2. December Press, 1998.

External links
 

1917 films
1917 comedy films
1910s English-language films
American silent feature films
Silent American comedy films
American black-and-white films
Universal Pictures films
Films directed by William Worthington
1910s American films